Fluent is an adjective related to fluency, the ability to communicate in a language quickly and accurately.

Fluent or fluency may also refer to:
 Fluent (mathematics), in mathematics, a continuous function
 Fluent (artificial intelligence), in artificial intelligence, a condition that varies over time
 Fluent, Inc., a company that develops software for computational fluid dynamics
 Fluent interface, a software engineering object-oriented construct
 Fluent (user interface), introduced in the 2007 Microsoft Office system
 Fluent Design System, a design language developed by Microsoft in 2017
 Fluentd, open source data collection software
 Fluency (handwriting), an aspect of handwriting ability

See also
 Fluenz (language learning software), a digital language learning platform